Basil Stillhart is a Swiss professional footballer who plays as a defensive midfielder for FC St. Gallen.

References

External links
 

1994 births
Living people
Swiss men's footballers
People from Wil
FC Wil players
FC Thun players
Swiss Super League players
Swiss Challenge League players
Switzerland under-21 international footballers
Association football midfielders
Sportspeople from the canton of St. Gallen